Elections to Chorley Borough Council were held on 4 May 1995.  One third of the council was up for election and the Labour Party took control (the council had been under no overall control since 1991.

After the election, the composition of the council was:

Election result
Source: Chorley Borough Council

Ward results

Adlington

Chorley East

Chorley North East

Chorley South East

Chorley South West ward

Chorley West ward

Clayton-le-Woods East

Clayton-le-Woods West and Cuerden

Coppull North ward

Coppull South ward

Eccleston and Heskin

Euxton North

Euxton South

Lostock

Whittle-le-Woods

Whithnell

References

Chorley
Chorley Borough Council elections